James Dwyer (27 November 1982) was born in Bandon, Co. Cork, Ireland. He won the ITF (International Taekwon-Do Federation) Taekwondo World Championships, (Adult Middle Weight Sparring category) which was held in Cheongju, South Korea, 4 to 8 July 2010.

References 

Living people
1982 births
Sportspeople from County Cork
Irish male taekwondo practitioners